Tarella was a genus of Early Devonian land plant with branching axes. Fossils came from Pragian age rocks.

A cladogram published in 2004 by Crane et al. places Tarella in the core of a paraphyletic stem group of broadly defined "zosterophylls", basal to the lycopsids (living and extinct clubmosses and relatives).

Hao and Xue in 2013 listed the genus as a zosterophyll.

References

External links
 Cladogram from 

Zosterophylls
Prehistoric lycophyte genera
Devonian plants
Devonian extinctions
Pragian life